Doris verrucosa is a species of sea slug, a dorid nudibranch, a marine gastropod mollusk in the family Dorididae.

Taxonomic history
The initial description by Linnaeus was based on older descriptions by Rumphius and was possibly not the species called by this name by subsequent taxonomists. In order to stabilise the nomenclature the name Doris verrucosa was conserved by the creation of a neotype.<ref>ICZN, Opinion 1980 (case 3088), (2001) [https://archive.org/stream/biostor-80720#page/n0/mode/2up Doris verrucosa Linnaeus, 1758 (Mollusca, Gastropoda): Generic and Specific Names Conserved by the Designation of a Neotype] Bulletin of Zoological Nomenclature 58(3) September 2001.</ref>

DescriptionDoris verrucosa is a yellow-brown oval nudibranch with a distinctive warty skin. It has eight gills arranged around the anus and its rhinophores are perfoliate. South African animals may reach a total length of 30 mm. The maximum recorded length is 70 mm.

Distribution
This species occurs in the Mediterranean Sea and in the Atlantic Ocean off France, Spain, the United Kingdom and Ireland. It has been reported from South Africa, where it is commonly known as the Warty dorid, but this may prove to be a separate, closely related species. Records of this species from the coast of Brazil have been demonstrated to be a separate species Doris januarii.

Ecology
In South Africa the warty dorid feeds on the crumb-of-bread sponge, Hymeniacidon cf. perlevis'', which it closely resembles in colour. Its egg mass is a tall upright collar of several complete whorls. It has been recorded from the intertidal zone to 14 m depth.

References

Dorididae
Gastropods described in 1758
Taxa named by Carl Linnaeus